Tetsuya Chaen (born 5 November 1973) is a Japanese former professional tennis player.

Born in Osaka, Chaen turned professional in 1993 and reached a best singles world ranking of 339 during his career, which included qualifying draw appearances at the Australian Open. He featured in the singles main draw of three ATP Tour tournaments, spanning 1994 to 2006. As a doubles player he had a highest ranking of 371 in the world.

ITF Futures titles

Singles: (1)

References

External links
 
 

1973 births
Living people
Japanese male tennis players
Sportspeople from Osaka Prefecture
20th-century Japanese people
21st-century Japanese people